A furlong is a measure of distance in imperial units and United States customary units equal to one eighth of a mile, equivalent to 660 feet, 220 yards, 40 rods, 10 chains or approximately 201 metres. It is now mostly confined to use in horse racing, where in many countries it is the standard measurement of race lengths, and agriculture, where is it used to measure rural field lengths and distances. 

This variation is too small to have practical consequences in most applications. 
 
Using the international definition of the yard as exactly 0.9144 metres, one furlong is 201.168 metres, and five furlongs are about 1 kilometre ( exactly).

History
Dating back at least to early Anglo-Saxon times, it originally referred to the length of the furrow in one acre of a ploughed open field (a medieval communal field which was divided into strips). The furlong (meaning furrow length) was the distance a team of oxen could plough without resting. This was standardised to be exactly 40 rods or 10 chains. The system of long furrows arose because turning a team of oxen pulling a heavy plough was difficult. This offset the drainage advantages of short furrows and meant furrows were made as long as possible. An acre is an area that is one furlong long and one chain (66 feet or 22 yards) wide. For this reason, the furlong was once also called an acre's length, though in modern usage an area of one acre can be of any shape. The term furlong, or shot, was also used to describe a grouping of adjacent strips within an open field.

Among the early Anglo-Saxons, the rod was the fundamental unit of land measurement. A furlong was 40 rods; an acre 4 by 40 rods, or 4 rods by 1 furlong, and thus 160 square rods; there are 10 acres in a square furlong. At the time, the Saxons used the North German foot, which was about 10 percent longer than the foot of the international 1959 agreement. When England changed to a shorter foot in the late 13th century, rods and furlongs remained unchanged, since property boundaries were already defined in rods and furlongs. The only thing that changed was the number of feet and yards in a rod or a furlong, and the number of square feet and square yards in an acre. The definition of the rod went from 15 old feet to  new feet, or from 5 old yards to  new yards. The furlong went from 600 old feet to 660 new feet, or from 200 old yards to 220 new yards. The acre went from 36,000 old square feet to 43,560 new square feet, or from 4,000 old square yards to 4,840 new square yards.  

The furlong was historically viewed as being equivalent to the Roman stade (stadium), which in turn derived from the Greek system. For example, the King James Bible uses the term "furlong" in place of the Greek stadion, although more recent translations often use miles or kilometres in the main text and give the original numbers in footnotes.

In the Roman system, there were 625 feet to the stadium, eight stadia to the mile, and three miles to the league. A league was considered to be the distance a man could walk in one hour, and the mile (from mille, meaning "thousand") consisted of 1,000 passus (paces, five feet, or double-step).

After the fall of the Western Roman Empire, medieval Europe continued with the Roman system, which the people proceeded to diversify, leading to serious complications in trade, taxation, etc. Around the year 1300, by royal decree England standardized a long list of measures. Among the important units of distance and length at the time were the foot, yard, rod (or pole), furlong, and the mile. The rod was defined as  yards or  feet, and the mile was eight furlongs, so the definition of the furlong became 40 rods and that of the mile became 5,280 feet (eight furlongs/mile times 40 rods/furlong times  feet/rod).

A description from 1675 states, "Dimensurator or Measuring Instrument whereof the mosts usual has been the Chain, and the common length for English Measures four Poles, as answering indifferently to the Englishs Mile and Acre, 10 such Chains in length making a Furlong, and 10 single square Chains an Acre, so that a square Mile contains 640 square Acres." —John Ogilby, Britannia, 1675

The official use of the furlong was abolished in the United Kingdom under the Weights and Measures Act 1985, an act that also abolished the official use of many other traditional units of measurement.

Use

In Myanmar, furlongs are currently used in conjunction with miles to indicate distances on highway signs. Mileposts on the Yangon–Mandalay Expressway use miles and furlongs.

In the rest of the world, the furlong has very limited use, with the notable exception of horse racing in most English-speaking countries, including Canada and the United States. The distances for horse racing in Australia were converted to metric in 1972, but in the United Kingdom, Ireland, Canada, and the United States, races are still given in miles and furlongs. Also distances along English  canals navigated by narrowboats are commonly expressed in miles and furlongs.

The city of Chicago's street numbering system allots a measure of 800 address units to each mile, in keeping with the city's system of eight blocks per mile. This means that every block in a typical Chicago neighborhood (in either north–south or east–west direction but rarely both) is approximately one furlong in length. Salt Lake City's blocks are also each a square furlong in the downtown area. The blocks become less regular in shape farther from the center, but the numbering system (800 units to each mile) remains the same everywhere in Salt Lake County. Blocks in central Logan, Utah, and in large sections of Phoenix, Arizona, are similarly a square furlong in extent (eight to a mile, which explains the series of freeway exits: 19th Ave, 27th, 35th, 43rd, 51st, 59th ...). City blocks in the Hoddle Grid of Melbourne are also one furlong in length.

Much of Ontario, Canada, was originally surveyed on a ten-furlong grid, with major roads being laid out along the grid lines. Now that distances are shown on road signs in kilometres, these major roads are almost exactly two kilometres apart. The exits on highways running through Toronto, for example, are generally at intervals of two kilometres.

The Bangor City Forest in Bangor, Maine has its trail system marked in miles and furlongs.

The furlong is also a base unit of the humorous FFF system of units.

Definition of length

The exact length of the furlong varies slightly among English-speaking countries. In Canada and the United Kingdom, which define the furlong in terms of the international yard of exactly 0.9144 metres, a furlong is 201.168 m.
Australia does not formally define the furlong, but it does define the chain and link in terms of the international yard.

In the United States, which defines the furlong, chain, rod, and link in terms of the U.S. survey foot of exactly  metre, a furlong is approximately 201.1684 m long. The United States does not formally define a "survey yard". The difference of approximately two parts per million between the U.S. value and the "international" value is insignificant for most practical measurements.

In October 2019, U.S. National Geodetic Survey and National Institute of Standards and Technology announced their joint intent to retire the U.S. survey foot, with effect from the end of 2022. The furlong in U.S. Customary units is thereafter defined based on the International 1959 foot, giving the length of the furlong as exact 201.168 meters in the United States as well.

See also
FFF system
Stadion (unit)

References

Customary units of measurement in the United States
Horse racing terminology
Imperial units
Road transport in Myanmar
Surveying
Units of length